Kaldafjellet is a mountain on the border of Agder and Rogaland counties in southern Norway. The mountain lies on the border of the municipality of Suldal (in Rogaland county) and the municipality of Bykle (in Agder county).

The lake Ormsavatnet lies just east of the mountain and the lake Holmevatnet.

References

Mountains of Rogaland
Mountains of Agder
Suldal
Bykle